The Sikkim Legislative Assembly is the unicameral state legislature of Sikkim state in north-eastern India. The seat of the Legislative Assembly is at Gangtok, the capital of the Sikkim state.

History
Sikkim became the 22nd state of India by the 36th Amendment of the Indian Constitution in 1975. The Act provides that the Legislative Assembly of Sikkim shall consist of not less than thirty two members and that "the Assembly of Sikkim formed as a result of the elections held in Sikkim in April 1974 with 32 members elected in the said elections (hereinafter referred to as the sitting members) shall be deemed to be the legislative Assembly of the State of Sikkim duly constituted under the Constitution."

It was a tiny Himalayan kingdom, ruled by a hereditary monarchy for about 3 centuries from the 17 century CE to 1975. In 1950, the kingdom became a protectorate of the Government of India, and was vested with autonomy in its internal affairs while its defense, communications and external relations became the responsibility of India. The kingdom finally opted to become full-fledged state of the Indian Union with effect from 26 April 1975.

Kazi Lhendup Dorjee was the first Chief Minister of Sikkim state from 1975 to 1979. Nar Bahadur Bhandari and Pawan Kumar Chamling served long terms as Chief Minister. As of the 2019 Sikkim Legislative Assembly election, Prem Singh Tamang is the Chief Minister.

Speakers of the Assembly

Structure

There are 32 members in the legislative assembly. There are 12 seats reserved for Scheduled Tribes (ST). These scheduled tribes include ethnic tribes such as Bhutia, Lepcha (Sherpa), Limbu, Tamang and other Sikkimese Nepali Communities, as specified during the merger of the Kingdom of Sikkim (monarchy) into India. 2 seats reserved for Scheduled Castes (SC). One seat (Sangha) is reserved for the Buddhist monastic community of Sikkim.

Members of Legislative Assembly
The tenth assembly was elected in 2019 Sikkim Legislative Assembly election. The current members  are listed below:

See also
 List of constituencies of the Sikkim Legislative Assembly
 List of chief ministers of Sikkim
 List of states of India by type of legislature
 Vidhan Sabha

References

 
State legislatures of India
Unicameral legislatures
Government of Sikkim
1975 establishments in Sikkim